The Topp Twins: Untouchable Girls is a New Zealand documentary film, directed by Leanne Pooley and released in 2009. The film profiles The Topp Twins, a lesbian comedy music duo from New Zealand.

One of the most successful documentary films at the New Zealand box office, the film made over $1 million in its first four weeks of release. To date, it has made almost $2 million in box office sales. The film was produced by Arani Cuthbert. The cinematographer was Leon Narbey.

The film was also screened internationally.

Awards
The film was nominated for three awards at the 2009 Qantas Film and Television Awards, for Best Feature Film – budget under $1 million, Best Original Music in a Feature Film and Best Sound Design in a Feature Film. It won the awards for Best Feature Film and Best Original Music.

At the 2009 Toronto International Film Festival, it won the People's Choice Award for Documentaries.

The film was a nominee for Outstanding Documentary at the 21st GLAAD Media Awards.

References

External links
 
 

2009 films
2009 documentary films
New Zealand documentary films
New Zealand LGBT-related films
2009 LGBT-related films
Documentary films about lesbians
Documentary films about women in music
2000s English-language films
English-language documentary films